Arthur Dight (6 June 1819 – 31 July 1895) was an Australian politician.

He was born at Windsor  son of John Dight, surgeon and pioneer settler, and Hannah,  Hilton. A landowner, he ran stations in Queensland. On 29 July 1861 he married Jannet McCracken, with whom he had ten children.

In 1869 he was elected to the New South Wales Legislative Assembly for Windsor, serving until his retirement in 1872. Dight died at Darling Point in 1895.

His brother Charles Hilton was a miller and a member of the Victorian Legislative Council, while his nephew, also called Charles Hilton, was subsequently elected to the New South Wales Legislative Assembly as the member for Singleton.

References

 

1819 births
1895 deaths
Members of the New South Wales Legislative Assembly
19th-century Australian politicians